Daniel John Ronan (July 13, 1914 – August 13, 1969) was a U.S. Representative from Illinois.

Born in Chicago, Illinois, Ronan attended parochial schools.
He graduated from St. Ignatius High School in 1933, from Loyola University Chicago in 1938, and took postgraduate work there from 1939 to 1941 and 1947 to 1948.

During World War II, Ronan served in U.S. Army Air Forces communications in the China Burma India Theater from 1942 to 1945. He served as member of the state house of representatives from 1948 to 1952, and was an alderman in Chicago from 1951 to 1964. Ronan was appointed acting ward committeeman in 1959, elected in 1960, and reelected in 1964; he served as member of the Chicago Planning Commission from 

Ronan's successor, George W. Collins, served only until December 1972, killed in the crash of United Airlines Flight 553 in Chicago.

See also
 List of United States Congress members who died in office (1950–99)

References

External links

1914 births
1969 deaths
Politicians from Chicago
Loyola University Chicago alumni
Chicago City Council members
Democratic Party members of the Illinois House of Representatives
Military personnel from Illinois
United States Army Air Forces soldiers
Democratic Party members of the United States House of Representatives from Illinois
20th-century American politicians
United States Army Air Forces personnel of World War II